{{DISPLAYTITLE:C12H19NO2}}
The molecular formula C12H19NO2 (molar mass: 209.28 g/mol, exact mass: 209.141579) may refer to:
 Bamethan
 2CD-5EtO
 2C-E
 2C-G
 Dimethoxymethamphetamine
 2,5-Dimethoxy-4-methylamphetamine
 Methyl-DMA
 Mirogabalin
 Octyl cyanoacrylate
 2-Octyl cyanoacrylate
 Psi-DOM